Ethyl methacrylate is the organic compound with the formula C2H5O2CC(CH3)=CH2.  A colorless liquid, it is a common monomer for the preparation of acrylate polymers.  It is typically polymerized under free-radical conditions.

Ethyl methacrylate was first obtained by treating 2-hydroxyisobutyric acid with phosphorus pentachloride in an apparent dehydration reaction.

Environmental issues and health hazards
The acute toxicity of the related butyl methacrylate is the LD50 is 20 g/kg (oral, rat). Acrylate esters irritate the eyes and can cause blindness.

See also
 Methyl methacrylate
 Butyl methacrylate

References

Methacrylate esters
Monomers
Commodity chemicals